Aegires lemoncello is a species of sea slug. It is a dorid nudibranch, a shell-less marine gastropod mollusc in the family Aegiridae.

Distribution 
This species was described from Barracuda Point, Pig Island, Madang, Papua New Guinea. It has also been reported from New Caledonia and South Africa.

References

Aegiridae
Gastropods described in 2004